Montrose Women's Football Club are a Scottish women's football club based in the town of Montrose, Angus. They are Scottish Women's Football members and currently play in the Scottish Women's Premier League 2 in the second tier of women's football in Scotland.

Club history
The club were established by the Montrose Community Trust, the charitable arm of Montrose FC, in 2016. They began playing competitive football a year later and first played in the SWFL Second Division (East). They finished their debut season in seventh place.

Montrose then moved in the 2018 season to the Second Division (North). Montrose were crowned champions and promoted to First Division (North) on the final match day with a 1-2 away to runners-up Stonehaven.

In the 2019 season, their first season in the Scottish third tier, Montrose placed seventh. The following two seasons (2020 and 2020–21) were both abandoned due to the coronavirus pandemic After the withdrawal of Forfar Farmington from the SWPL at the end of the 2020–21 season, Montrose became the highest ranked Angus team in the Scottish national leagues.

Montrose won the 2021–22 Scottish Women's Football Championship North with an incredible unbeaten season, securing promotion to SWPL 2 with a 4-1 victory over promotion rivals East Fife. The club also reached the inaugural SWF Championship Cup final that season, losing 1-0 to league rivals Dryburgh Athletic at Falkirk Stadium.

The club are still members of the Montrose Community Trust, along with Montrose Youth FC, Montrose Amateur FC, Montrose Walking FC.

Honours
Scottish Women's Football Championship North (third tier):

 Winners: 2021–22

Scottish Women's Football League Second Division North (fourth tier):

 Winners: 2017

SWF Championship Cup:

 Runners up: 2021-22

Club records
Biggest win:

 0-19 v Caithness, 18 Feb 2018, Second Division (North)
 0-19 v Gleniffer Thistle, 29 Aug 2021, SWF Championship Cup
 19-0 v Dundee City West, 27 Feb 2022, Championship North

Biggest loss: 0-11 v Aberdeen, 22 Feb 2019, First Division (North)

References

Scottish Women's Premier League clubs
Montrose, Angus
Association football clubs established in 2016